Shangton is a parish and small village near Tur Langton in Leicestershire, England, and part of Harborough district.

External links

Detailed History
Photographs around village
Parish Profile 2001
Map of Village

Villages in Leicestershire
Civil parishes in Harborough District